The Gliwice Radio Tower is a transmission tower in the Szobiszowice district of Gliwice, Upper Silesia, Poland.

Structure
The Gliwice Radio Tower is 111 m tall, with a wooden framework of impregnated siberian larch linked by brass connectors. It was nicknamed "the Silesian Eiffel Tower" by the local population. The tower has four platforms, which are 40.4 m, 55.3 m, 80.0 m and 109.7 m above ground. The top platform measures 2.13 x 2.13 m. A ladder with 365 steps provides access to the top.

The tower is the tallest wooden structure in Europe. The tower was originally designed to carry aerials for medium wave broadcasting, but that transmitter is no longer in service because the final stage is missing. Today, the Gliwice Radio Tower carries multiple transceiver antennas for mobile phone services and a low-power FM transmitter broadcasting on 93.4 MHz.

History
The tower was erected from 1 August 1934 as Sendeturm Gleiwitz (Gleiwitz Radio Tower), when the territory was part of Germany. It was operated by the Reichssender Breslau (former Schlesische Funkstunde broadcasting corporation) of the Reichs-Rundfunk-Gesellschaft radio network. The tower was modeled on the Mühlacker radio transmitter, it replaced a smaller transmitter in Gleiwitz situated nearby on Raudener Straße and went in service on 23 December 1935.

On 31 August 1939, the German SS staged a 'Polish' attack on Gleiwitz radio station, which was later used as justification for the invasion of Poland. The transmission facility was not demolished in World War II. From 4 October 1945 until the inauguration of the new transmitter in Ruda Śląska in 1955 the Gliwice transmitter was used for medium-wave transmissions by the Polish state broadcaster Polskie Radio. After 1955, it was used to jam medium-wave stations (such as Radio Free Europe) broadcasting Polish-language programmes from Western Europe.

Transmitted programmes

Radio

See also

Gleiwitz incident
List of towers

References

External links
Museum on Radio History and Visual Arts 

  
SkyscraperPage.com
Tower on Google Maps
http://radiopolska.pl/wykaz/pokaz_lokalizacja.php?pid=356
https://web.archive.org/web/20130417065346/http://nadaje.com/nadajniki/138/gliwice-wieza-radiostacji
Site on GeoPortal

Broadcast transmitters
Buildings and structures in Gliwice
Radio masts and towers in Poland
Towers completed in 1935
Wooden towers
1935 establishments in Poland